David Stirling (born 10 September 1962) is a former Australian rules footballer who played with the Sydney Swans in the Victorian Football League (VFL).

Stirling, a half forward flanker and wingman, came to the Swans from Springvale. He missed the start of the 1983 VFL season with a hamstring injury, before debuting in Sydney's round 11 win over Footscray at the Sydney Cricket Ground, one of seven appearances that year.

References

1962 births
Australian rules footballers from Victoria (Australia)
Sydney Swans players
Casey Demons players
Living people